Plains is an unincorporated community on the high plains of the Llano Estacado in Borden County, Texas, United States. Oddly, it is not on many roadmaps, although its nearest Borden County neighbor, the defunct town Mesquite, on the same road, is.

References

Unincorporated communities in Borden County, Texas
Unincorporated communities in Texas